Roderich Kreile (born 1956) is a Lutheran church musician, choir director and university teacher. Since 1997, he has been the director of the Dresdner Kreuzchor at the Kreuzkirche, Dresden, as the 28th Kreuzkantor since the Reformation.

Life and work 

Kreile studied church music and choral conducting in Munich. In 1981, he became a cantor at the Christ Church in Munich. From 1989 to 1996 he taught choral conducting at the Hochschule für Musik und Theater München. He was appointed Kirchenmusikdirektor (director of church music) in 1990. In 1994, he also prepared the choir Philharmonischer Chor München for concerts with the Münchner Philharmoniker. In 2010 he became a member of the Sächsische Akademie der Künste (Saxon Academy of Arts). He has been the vice chairman of the Neue Bachgesellschaft and an advisory board member of the International Heinrich Schütz Society.

Since 1997, Kreile has been the 28th Kreuzkantor since the Reformation. Leading the Dresdner Kreuzchor with its history of more than 700 years is regarded as one of the most prestigious positions the Protestant church in Germany has to offer ("eines der ehrenvollsten Ämter der evangelischen Kirchenmusik"). He has a contract until 2022. With him, the Dresdner Kreuzchor has appeared extensively at home and abroad. Tours have taken the choir through Germany, other European countries, to the United States, South America, South Korea and Japan. It is one of few boys' choirs serving as ambassadors of Saxony abroad. He has conducted premieres of choral music. On 2 July 2022, he retired after 25 years in office and was succeeded by Martin Lehmann, who led the Windsbacher Knabenchor since 2012.

Selected recordings 

Kreile has recorded with the Dresdner Kreuzchor music written for Dresden, such as cantatas for Pentecost and a St John Passion which his predecessor the 15th Kreuzkantor Gottfried August Homilius composed for the Frauenkirche in Dresden.

Awards 

In 2005 the Dresdner Kreuzchor was awarded the Brahms-Preis (Brahms Prize). On 2 June 2012 Kreile was awarded the Sächsische Verfassungsmedaille by the president of the Saxon Landtag Matthias Rößler for "sein beeindruckendes künstlerisches Schaffen, das stets mit hohem persönlichen Einsatz und großem Erfolg verbunden ist" (his impressive artistic work, which is always associated with a high personal commitment and great success).

References

External links 

 
 Kreuzkantor Roderich Kreile: "Ich möchte mich in Zukunft ausführlicher in der Mehrchörigkeit, im Barock tummeln..." interview musik-in-dresden.de 25 April 2012 
 Roderich Kreile (Choral Conductor) bach-cantatas.com
 
 Roderich Kreile Dresden Music Festival

German Lutherans
German male conductors (music)
1956 births
Living people
Musicians from Dresden
Academic staff of the University of Music and Performing Arts Munich
21st-century German conductors (music)
21st-century German male musicians